Jale was a Canadian alternative rock band from Halifax, Nova Scotia, Canada.  Contemporaries of Sloan and The Super Friendz, they were formed in 1992 and disbanded in 1996. They released three records in all (the albums Dreamcake and So Wound and the EP "Closed").

Career
Jale was formed by four art school students in 1992. The guitarist Jennifer Pierce had earlier sung backing vocals on the album Smeared by Sloan. The other founders were Alyson MacLeod (drums), Laura Stein (bass guitar) and Eve Hartling (guitar). The band's name was formed from the first letters of the members' first names.  

Jale was the second Canadian band (after Eric's Trip) to be signed to the Seattle label Sub Pop.

Jale's first album, Dreamcake, was released in 1994. 

In November 1995, Jale regrouped to record their second album, So Wound, in Chicago. Mike Belitsky of the alt-country band The Sadies replaced McLeod as drummer. So Wound appeared to contain radio-friendly hits in "All Ready" and "Ali". However, Sub Pop pulled support for the album while the band was on tour.

Only a few months after the release of So Wound, Jale disbanded.

After the break up
Pierce, Stein and Belitsky continued as The Vees. They toured Canada twice and released an EP, The Vees, on the Halifax label Murderecords in 1997. The band stopped performing the following year.

Pierce, Stein and Belitsky resurfaced in 2000 as Chappaquiddick Skyline, a side project of the Massachusetts-based Pernice Brothers, and released an album, Chappaquiddick Skyline. Stein and Belitsky later appeared on the Pernice Brothers' albums The World Won't End (2001) and Yours, Mine and Ours (2003).  While in the band, Hartling worked on the graphic design of posters, album artwork and on art direction for music videos. She was nominated for a Juno award in 1997 for her album cover designs.She continued to paint, and after exhibiting her work in group shows in Halifax over several years, had her first solo show in 2005. Her most recent exhibition was in April 2010.  

Hartling lives and works in Halifax, Nova Scotia. Her work can be found in many private collections in Canada, United States and Europe.

References

External links
Jale on Sub Pop website

Canadian indie pop groups
All-female bands
Sub Pop artists
Musical groups from Halifax, Nova Scotia
Musical groups established in 1993
Canadian alternative rock groups
Musical groups disestablished in 1997
1993 establishments in Nova Scotia
1997 disestablishments in Nova Scotia